Scleronotus tricarinatus is a species of beetle in the family Cerambycidae, also known as “long-horned." It was described by Julio in 1998.

References

Acanthoderini
Beetles described in 1998